General elections were held in Kenya Colony in 1931. Five of the eleven white seats in the Legislative Council were uncontested, with Lord Delamere amongst those returned unopposed. Unlike previous elections, which were boycotted by the Indian population, this time the community participated. Fourteen candidates including two independents contested the five Indian seats. However, seven of them declared that they would not take their seats on the Council if elected until the separate voter rolls for whites and Indians were scrapped.

Results

Appointed members

Aftermath
The newly elected Legislative Council met for the first time on 2 June.

References

1931 elections in Africa
1931 in Kenya
1931
Legislative Council of Kenya
1931